The Kibali River is a tributary to the Uele River in the Democratic Republic of the Congo. The Uele is a tributary to the Ubangi River, which subsequently flows into the great Congo River.

Rivers of the Democratic Republic of the Congo